The Rural Municipality of Harrison is a former rural municipality (RM) in the Canadian province of Manitoba. It was originally incorporated as a rural municipality on December 22, 1883. It ceased on January 1, 2015 as a result of its provincially mandated amalgamation with the RM of Park to form the Municipality of Harrison Park.

The RM was located north of Brandon on the Yellowhead Highway with its offices  at Newdale, Manitoba. The main reserve of the Rolling River First Nation lied within the east-central portion of the RM. The RM was named for David Howard Harrison who became premier of Manitoba in 1887.

Communities 
 Newdale
 Rackham
 Sandy Lake

External links

References 

 Map of Harrison R.M. at Statcan
 Geographic Names of Manitoba (pg. 106) - the Millennium Bureau of Canada
 Manitoba Historical Society - Manitoba Municipalities: Rural Municipality of Harrison

Harrison
Populated places disestablished in 2015
2015 disestablishments in Manitoba